Sandra Keith (born 1968) is a New Zealand women's international lawn bowler.

Bowls career
Sandra Keith is a four times National champion, winning the New Zealand National Bowls Championships singles in 2012, pairs in 2013 and 2022 and fours in 2020.

The 2012 National singles win qualified her to play in the World Singles Champion of Champions in Cyprus, where she won the gold medal. She has also won two bronze medals at the Asia Pacific Bowls Championships.

References

Living people
New Zealand female bowls players
1968 births
20th-century New Zealand women
21st-century New Zealand women